Ourique is a H4 meteorite that fell in 1998 in Portugal.

History
During the night between 27 and 28 December 1998, a brilliant fireball and loud noises were reported by several people in Beja region.

Antonio Silva recovered the first fragments two days after the fall and, subsequently, local villagers recovered other pieces. Most of all fragments were found within an elliptical area long .

Composition and classification
It is a H4 type ordinary chondrite with a well-developed chondritic structure. Chemical analysis reported: olivine Fa18.3 and pyroxene Fs16.4.

See also 
 Glossary of meteoritics
 Meteorite

Notes

External links 
 Meteoritical Bulletin Database

Meteorites found in Portugal
1998 in Portugal
1998 in science